The history of the Jews in the Netherlands began largely in the 16th century when they began to settle in Amsterdam and other cities. It has continued to the present. During the occupation of the Netherlands by Nazi Germany in May 1940, the Jewish community was severely persecuted.

The area now known as the Netherlands was once part of the Spanish Empire but in 1581, the Northern Dutch provinces declared independence. A principal motive was the wish to practice Protestant Christianity, then forbidden under Spanish rule. Religious tolerance was effectively an important constitutional element of the newly independent state. This inevitably attracted the attention of Jews who were religiously oppressed in different parts of the world. In pursuit of religious freedoms, many Jews migrated to the Netherlands where they flourished.

During the Nazi occupation of the Netherlands in World War II, approximately 75 percent of the Jewish population of the Netherlands was murdered in the Holocaust through deportation to concentration and extermination camps.

History of Jews in the Netherlands

Early history
It was likely that the earliest Jews arrived in the "Low Countries", present-day Belgium and the Netherlands, during the Roman conquest early in the common era. Little is known about these early settlers, other than they were not very numerous. For some time, the Jewish presence consisted of, at most, small isolated communities and scattered families. Reliable documentary evidence dates only from the 1100s; for several centuries, the record reflects that the Jews were persecuted within the region and expelled on a regular basis. Early sources from the 11th and 12th centuries mention official debates or disputations between Christians and Jews, in which attempts were made to convince the Jews of the truth of Christianity and to try to convert them. They were documented in the other provinces at an earlier date, especially after their expulsion from France in 1321 and the persecutions in Hainaut and the Rhine provinces. The first Jews in the province of Gelderland were reported in 1325. Jews have been settled in Nijmegen, the oldest settlement, in Doesburg, Zutphen and in Arnhem since 1404. As of the 13th century, there are sources that indicate that Jews were living in Brabant and Limburg, mainly in cities such as Brussels, Leuven, Tienen and the jewishstreet of Maastricht (Dutch pronunciation: Jodenstraat (Maastricht)) from 1295 is another old proof of their existence.

Sources from the 14th century also mention Jewish residents in the cities of Antwerp and Mechelen and in the northern region of Geldern.

Between 1347 and 1351, Europe was hit by the plague or Black Death. This resulted in a new theme in medieval anti-Semitic rhetoric. The Jews were held responsible for the epidemic and for the way it was rapidly spreading, because presumably they were the ones who had poisoned the water of springs used by the Christians. Various medieval chronicles mention this, e.g., those of Radalphus de Rivo (c. 1403) of Tongeren, who wrote that Jews were murdered in the Brabant region and in the city of Zwolle because they were accused of spreading the Black Death. This accusation was added to other traditional blood libels against the Jews. They were accused of piercing the Host used for communion and killing Christian children to use as a blood offering during Passover. Local Jewish communities were often murdered in part or entirely or exiled in hysterical pogroms. In May 1370, six Jews were burned at the stake in Brussels because they were accused of theft and of desecrating the Holy Sacrament. In addition, documentation can be found of instances in which Jews were abused and insulted, e.g., in the cities of Zutphen, Deventer and Utrecht, for allegedly desecrating the Host. Rioters massacred the majority of the Jews in the region and expelled those who survived.

In 1349, the Duke of Guelders was authorized by the Emperor Louis IV of the Holy Roman Empire of Germany to receive Jews in his duchy, where they provided services, paid a tax and were protected by the law. In Arnhem, where a Jewish physician is mentioned, the magistrate defended him against the hostilities of the populace. When Jews settled in the diocese of Utrecht is unknown, but rabbinical records regarding Jewish dietary laws speculated that the Jewish community there dated to Roman times. In 1444, Jews were expelled from the city of Utrecht. Until 1789, Jews were prohibited from staying in the city overnight. They were tolerated in the village of Maarssen, two hours distant, though their condition was not fortuitous. But, the community of Maarssen was one of the most important Jewish settlements in the Netherlands. Jews were admitted to Zeeland by Albert, Duke of Bavaria.

In 1477, by the marriage of Mary of Burgundy to the Archduke Maximilian, son of Emperor Frederick III, the Netherlands were united to Austria and its possessions passed to the crown of Spain. In the sixteenth century, owing to the persecutions of Charles V and Philip II of Spain, the Netherlands became involved in a series of desperate and heroic struggles against this growing political and Catholic religious hegemony. In 1522, Charles V issued a proclamation in Gelderland and Utrecht against Christians who were suspected of being lax in the faith, as well as against Jews who had not been baptized. He repeated such edicts in 1545 and 1549, trying to suppress the Protestant Reformation, which was expanding. In 1571, the Duke of Alba notified the authorities of Arnhem that all Jews living there should be seized and held until their fates were determined.

At Dutch request, Archduke Mattias established religious peace in most of the provinces, which was later guaranteed by article 13 of the 1579 Unie van Utrecht. Moreover, in 1581, the deputies of the United Provinces declared independence by issuing the Act of Abjuration, which deposed Philip as their sovereign. As a consequence of these two events, Jews persecuted in Spain and Portugal turned toward the Dutch Republic as a place of refuge.

Sephardim

Sephardim or Sephardic Jews (sometimes referred to as Spanish and Portuguese Jews), were native to Sepharad, the Hebrew name for Spain and Portugal. They had been expelled or were forced to convert to Catholicism in the late 15th century through the Spanish Alhambra Decree of 1492, and later the Portuguese Edicts of 1496 and 1497. Many still remained in the Iberian peninsula, practicing either their new religion in public and Judaism in secret or both (see anusim, crypto-Jews or Marranos). The newly independent and tolerant Dutch provinces provided more favourable conditions for observant Jews to establish a community, and to practice their religion openly. The Rabbi of the Portuguese-Spanish Synagogue in Amsterdam, still in use today, was Abraham Cohen Pimentel (died 21 March 1697). The services are still held in the Portuguese language. The Portuguese Jews migrated most notably to the city of Amsterdam. As they became established, they collectively brought new trading expertise and connections to the city. They also brought navigation knowledge and techniques from Portugal, which enabled the Netherlands to start competing in overseas trade with the Spanish and Portuguese colonies.

After having been refused admission to Middelburg and Haarlem, these Anusim arrived in Amsterdam in 1593. Among them were skilled artisans, physicians and prominent merchants such as Jacob Tirado, who obtained permission from the authorities to practice Judaism within his household. Those "Jews of the Portuguese Nation" worked in common cause with the people of Amsterdam and contributed materially to the prosperity of the country; they were strong supporters of the House of Orange and were protected by the Stadholder. During the Twelve Years' Truce, the commerce of the Dutch Republic increased considerably, and a period of strong development ensued. This was particularly true for Amsterdam, where the Marranos had established their main port and base of operations. They maintained foreign trade relationships in the Mediterranean, including Venice, the Levant and Morocco. The Sultan of Morocco had an ambassador at The Hague named Samuel Pallache, through whose mediation, in 1620, a commercial understanding was reached with the Barbary States.

The Sephardic Jews of Amsterdam also established trade relationships with other countries in Europe. In the early 1620s numerous Jews migrated from Holland to the Lower Elbe region. In a letter dated 25 November 1622, King Christian IV of Denmark invited Jews of Amsterdam to settle in Glückstadt, where, among other privileges, they were assured the free exercise of their religion.

The trade developed between the Dutch and Spanish South America was established by such Iberian Jews. They also contributed to establishing the Dutch West Indies Company in 1621, and some of them sat on its directorate. The ambitious schemes of the Dutch for the conquest of Brazil were carried into effect by Francisco Ribeiro, a Portuguese captain, who is said to have had Jewish relations in Holland. The Sephardic Jews of Amsterdam strongly supported the Dutch Republic in its struggle with Portugal for the possession of Brazil, which started in Recife with the arrival of Count Johan Maurits of Nassau-Siegen in 1637. Some years later, the Dutch in Brazil appealed for more craftsmen of all kinds, and many Jews heeded the call. In 1642 about 600 Jews left Amsterdam for Brazil, accompanied by two distinguished scholars, Isaac Aboab da Fonseca and Moses Raphael de Aguilar. After the loss of the Dutch colony of Recife to the Portuguese in 1654, they sought refuge in other Dutch colonies, including the island of Curaçao in the Caribbean and New Amsterdam (Manhattan) in North America.

Besides merchants, many physicians were among the Spanish Jews in Amsterdam. These included Samuel Abravanel, David Nieto, Elijah Montalto, and the Bueno family. Joseph Bueno was consulted in the illness of Prince Maurice in April, 1623. Jews were admitted as students to the university, where they studied medicine as the only branch of science that was of practical use to them. They were not allowed to practice law, because lawyers were required to take a Christian oath, thereby excluding them. Jews were also excluded from the trade guilds, as in a 1632 resolution passed by the city of Amsterdam (the Dutch cities were largely autonomous). However, they were allowed to practice certain trades: printing, bookselling, and selling meat, poultry, groceries, and medicines. In 1655 a Sephardic Jew was exceptionally permitted to establish a sugar refinery using chemical methods.

Several Sephardic Jews stood out during that time, including Menasseh Ben Israel. He was known for corresponding widely with Christian leaders and helped to promote Jewish resettlement in England. Perhaps the most famous among Dutch Jews of Sephardic origin is Benedictus de Spinoza (Baruch Spinoza), a philosopher, scholar and optician who was excommunicated from the Jewish community in 1656 after speaking out his ideas concerning (the nature of) God, later published in his famous work Ethics Demonstrated in Geometrical Order (1677).

Ashkenazim
Many German Jews were also attracted later to the tolerant and independent Dutch provinces, generally after the mid-17th century, whichof one example could be the Haham Tzvi. Unlike the more acculturated Iberian Jews, most of these were displaced residents of Jewish ghettos escaping persecution. In addition they were displaced by the violence of the Thirty Year War (1618–1648) in other parts of northern Europe, and local expulsions, as well as the 1648 Khmelnytsky uprising in what was then eastern Poland. These poor immigrants were less welcomed. Their arrival in considerable number threatened the economic status of Amsterdam in particular, and with few exceptions they were turned away. They generally settled in rural areas, where they subsisted typically as peddlers and hawkers. Many smaller Jewish communities were started throughout the Dutch provinces.

Over time, many German Jews gained prosperity through retail trading and they became specialists in diamond-cutting and sales. They had a monopoly in the latter trade until about 1870. When William IV was proclaimed stadholder (1747), the Jews found another protector. He had close relations with the head of the DePinto family, at whose villa, Tulpenburg, near Ouderkerk, he and his wife paid more than one visit. In 1748, when a French army was at the frontier and the treasury was empty, De Pinto collected a large sum and presented it to the state. Van Hogendorp, the secretary of state, wrote to him: "You have saved the state." In 1750 De Pinto arranged for the conversion of the national debt from a 4 to a 3% basis.

Under the government of William V, the country was troubled by internal dissensions. But the Jews remained loyal to him. As he entered the legislature on the day of his majority, 8 March 1766, in the synagogues services of thanks-giving were held. William V visited both the German and the Portuguese synagogues on 3 June 1768. He also attended the marriages of offspring of various prominent Jewish families.

French Revolution and Napoleon
The year 1795 brought the results of the French Revolution to the Netherlands, including emancipation for the Jews. The National Convention, on 2 September 1796, proclaimed this resolution: "No Jew shall be excluded from rights or advantages which are associated with citizenship in the Batavian Republic, and which he may desire to enjoy." Moses Moresco was appointed member of the municipality at Amsterdam; Moses Asser member of the court of justice there. The old conservatives, at whose head stood the chief rabbi Jacob Moses Löwenstamm, were not desirous of emancipation rights. Indeed, these rights were for the greater part of doubtful advantage; their culture was not so far advanced that they could frequent ordinary society; besides, this emancipation was offered to them by a party which had expelled their beloved Prince of Orange, to whose house they remained so faithful that the chief rabbi at The Hague, Saruco, was called the "Orange dominie"; the men of the old régime were even called "Orange cattle". Nevertheless, the Revolution appreciably ameliorated the condition of the Jews; in 1799 their congregations received, like the Christian congregations, grants from the treasury. In 1798 Jonas Daniel Meijer interceded with the French minister of foreign affairs in behalf of the Jews of Germany; and on 22 August 1802, the Dutch ambassador, Schimmelpenninck, delivered a note on the same subject to the French minister.

From 1806 to 1810 the Kingdom of Holland was ruled by Louis Bonaparte, whose intention it was to so amend the condition of the Jews that their newly acquired rights would become of real value to them; the shortness of his reign, however, prevented him from carrying out his plans. For example, after having changed the market-day in some cities (Utrecht and Rotterdam) from Saturday to Monday, he abolished the use of the "Oath More Judaico" in the courts of justice, and administered the same formula to both Christians and Jews. To accustom the latter to military services he formed two battalions of 803 men and 60 officers, all Jews, who had been until then excluded from military service, even from the town guard.

The union of Ashkenazim and Sephardim intended by Louis Napoleon did not come about. He had desired to establish schools for Jewish children, who were excluded from the public schools; even the Maatschappij tot Nut van 't Algemeen, founded in 1784, did not willingly receive them or admit Jews as members. Among the distinguished Jews of this period were Meier Littwald Lehemon, Mozes Salomon Asser, Capadose, and the physicians David Heilbron, Davids (who introduced vaccination), Stein van Laun (tellurium), and many others.

19th century and early 20th century

On 30 November 1813, William VI arrived at Scheveningen, and on 11 December he was solemnly crowned as King William I.

Chief Rabbi Lehmans of The Hague organized a special thanksgiving service, asking for protection for the allied armies on 5 January 1814. Many Jews fought at Waterloo, where thirty-five Jewish officers died. William VI promulgated a law abolishing the French régime. The Jews prospered in the independent Netherlands throughout the 19th century. By 1900, Amsterdam had 51,000 Jews, with 12,500 paupers; The Hague 5,754 Jews, with 846; Rotterdam 10,000, with 1,750; Groningen 2,400, with 613; Arnhem 1,224 with 349. The total population of the Netherlands in 1900 was 5,104,137, about 2% of whom were Jews. The introduction in 1919 of equal suffrage for men and women was the completion of a long process. The fact that women had to fight for the right to vote has indirectly to do with Aletta Jacobs. Originally, the law only set a wage limit for voting. Because she was the first female doctor, she met this wage limit and wanted to exercise her right to vote. It was only after her attempt that it was explicitly legislated for women to vote in 1919. Other prominent Dutch Jews were: Jozef Israëls (painter), Tobias Asser (winner Nobel Peace Prize in 1911), Gerard Philips (founder NV Philips' Gloeilampenfabrieken Philips), Lodewijk Ernst Visser (lawyer and president of the High Council of the Netherlands, Commander in the Order of Orange-Nassau and Knight in the Order of the Dutch Lion), The Brabant Jewish family businesses from Oss, including margarine producer Samuel van den Bergh was one of the founders of Unilever. Saal van Zwanenberg was the producer of the Zwan meat products, but perhaps even better known as the founder of the pharmaceutical company Organon, and thus as the founder of AkzoNobel. The company of Hartog Hartog was acquired by Unilever, the Unox meat products are a continuation of the meat activities of this family business, Simon Philip Goudsmit (founder De Bijenkorf), Leo Meyer and Arthur Isaac (founders HEMA (store)), Leo Fuld (Jewish singer of Rotterdam), Herman Woudstra (founder Hollandia Matzes formerly: "Paaschbroodfabriek" in Enschede), Eduard Meijers (lawyer and founder of the current Burgerlijk Wetboek (Civil Code of the Netherlands)).

The Netherlands, and Amsterdam in particular, remained a major Jewish population centre until World War II. Amsterdam was known as Jerusalem of the West by its Jewish residents. In the late 19th and early 20th century, the community grew as Jews from the mediene (the "country" Jews), migrated to larger cities to seek better jobs and living conditions.

Boundaries between Gentiles and Jews started 1) to blur due to increase in Gentile-Jewish marriages and residential spreading, 2) to cross due to a decrease in observance of religious practices like Sabbath and eating kosher food, and 3) to shift as civic involvement and political participation increased.

Dutch Jews were a relatively small part of the population and showed a strong tendency towards internal migration.  They never coalesced into a real pillar. One of the reasons was the attraction of the socialist and liberal "pillars" before the Holocaust, rather than becoming part of a Jewish pillar. Especially the rise of socialism was a new segment in the pillarized Dutch society that attracted and was created by intermarrying Jews, and Jews and Christians who had abandoned their religious affiliation. Religious-ethnic background was of less importance within the socialist and liberal segments, though individuals could maintain some rituals or practices.

The number of Jews in the Netherlands grew at a slower rate than the general population from the early 19th century up to World War II. Between 1830 and 1930, the Jewish population in the Netherlands increased by almost 250% (numbers given by the Jewish communities to the Dutch Census) while the total population of the Netherlands grew by 297%.

(*) Derived from those persons who stated "Judaism" as their religion in the Dutch Census

(**) Persons with at least one Jewish grandparent. In another Nazi census the total number of people with at least one Jewish grandparent in the Netherlands was put at 160,886: 135,984 people with 4 or 3 Jewish grandparents (counted as "full Jews"); 18,912 Jews with 2 Jewish grandparents ("half Jews"), of whom 3,538 were part of a Jewish congregation; 5,990 with 1 Jewish grandparent ("quarter Jews")

(***) Membership numbers of Dutch Jewish congregations (only those who are Jewish according to the Halakha)

The Holocaust

In 1939, there were some 140,000 Dutch Jews living in the Netherlands, among them some 24,000 to 25,000 German-Jewish refugees who had fled from Germany in the 1930s. (Other sources claim that some 34,000 Jewish refugees entered the Netherlands between 1933 and 1940, mostly from Germany and Austria).

Some 75% of the Dutch-Jewish population was murdered in the Holocaust. The 1947 census reported 14,346 Jews, or 10% of the pre-war population. This further decrease is attributed to massive aliyah  to Mandatory Palestine.

1945–1960

The Jewish-Dutch population after the Second World War is marked by certain significant changes: disappointment, emigration, a low birth rate, and a high intermarriage rate. After the Second World War and the Holocaust, returning Jews and Jews who had survived the often difficult hidden living ('diving') met with total lack of understanding of their fate and had to endure lasting loss of property. Especially mental health care was lacking and only started to develop from 1960 onwards in the Sinai centrum in Amersfoort. From 1973 professor Bastiaans tried to treat Holocaust victims with LSD in the Centrum '45 in Oegstgeest, attached to the Leyden University. This brought little success, if any. Understanding started to grow by a series of four TV documentaries on the Nazi occupation of the Netherlands made by the Jewish historian Lou de Jong, broadcast on Dutch national public TV (NTS, then the sole TV channel). The first four installments aired in 1960, were considered a turning point and left many Dutch, who until then had hardly had any notion of the gruesome depth of the Holocaust, aghast. The series continued through 1964. Dr De Jong subsequently published a 14-part, 29-volume history of the Netherlands during World War II.

In 1965, the Jewish professor of history Jaques Presser published his magister opus Ondergang (Demise – the Persecution and Eradication of Dutch Jewry). The work was reprinted six times during its first year, reaching the extraordinary print run of 150,000 – still today a record in the history of publishing in the Netherlands.

Nevertheless, as a result of the lack of understanding, mental and physical health problems, too many missing relatives and general administrational difficulties, thousands of surviving Jews emigrated, or made aliyah to Mandatory Palestine, later Israel. Aliyah from the Netherlands initially surpassed that of any other Western nation. Israel is still home to some 6,000 Dutch Jews. Others emigrated to the United States. There was a high assimilation and intermarriage rate among those who stayed. As a result, the Jewish birth rate and organized community membership dropped. In the aftermath of the Holocaust, and the sharp increase of understanding for the shoah, relations with non-Jews were gradually friendly. The Jewish community received reparations payments from the Dutch government. Also reparations from Germany (aka 'Wiedergutmachung') started to trickle down into Dutch Jewish households.

In 1947, two years after the end of the Second World War in the Netherlands, the total number of Jews as counted in the population census was just 14,346 (less than 10 percent of the count of 154,887 by the Nazi occupation force in 1941). Later, this number was adjusted by Jewish organisations to some 24,000 Jews living in the Netherlands in 1954. This was a huge loss compared to the number of Jews counted in 1941. This latter number was disputed, as the Nazi occupation force counted Jews on their classification of race. They included hundreds of Christians of Jewish heritage in the Nazi census. (According to Raul Hilberg, in his book, Perpetrators Victims Bystanders: the Jewish Catastrophe, 1933–1945, "the Netherlands ... [had] 1,572 Protestants [of Jewish heritage in 1943] ... There were also some 700 Catholic Jews living in the Netherlands [during the Nazi occupation] ...")

In 1954, the Dutch Jews were recorded in the Netherlands as follows (province; number of Jews):
 Groningen – 242
 Friesland – 155
 Drenthe – 180
 Overijssel – 945
 Gelderland – 997
 Utrecht – 848
 North Holland – 15,446 (including 14,068 in Amsterdam)
 South Holland – 3,934
 Zeeland – 59
 North Brabant – 620
 Limburg – 297
 Total – 23,723

1960s and 1970s
Because of the loss of 79% of the population, including many children and young people, the birth rate among Jews declined in the 1960s and 1970s. Intermarriage increased; the intermarriage rate of Jewish males was 41% and of Jewish women 28% in the period of 1945–1949. By the 1990s, the percentage of intermarriage increased to some 52% of all Jewish marriages. Among males, or so-called "father Jews", the intermarriage rate is as high as 80%. Some within the Jewish community have tried to counter this trend, creating possibilities for single Jews to meet other single Jews. The dating sites Jingles and Jentl en Jewell are for that purpose. There are proportionally more Jewish Dutch women in the labor force than non-Jewish Dutch women.

1980s and onwards
Since the late 20th century, a number of mostly Israeli and Russian Jews have immigrated to the Netherlands, the latter after the Soviet Union eased emigration and after its dissolution. Approximately one in three Dutch Jews was born elsewhere. The number of Israeli Jews living in the Netherlands (concentrated in Amsterdam) runs in the thousands (estimates run from 5,000 to 7,000 Israeli expatriates in the Netherlands, although some claims go as high as 12,000). A relatively small number of these Israeli Jews is connected to one of the religious Jewish institutions in the Netherlands. In the 21st century, some 10,000 Dutch Jews have emigrated to Israel.

As of 2006, approximately 41,000 to 45,000 people in the Netherlands either identify as Jewish, or are defined as Jewish by halakha (Rabbinic law), by which persons with Jewish mothers are defined as Jewish. About 70% of these (approximately 30,000) have a Jewish mother. Another 30% have a Jewish father (some 10,000–15,000 persons; their number was estimated at 12,470 in April 2006). Orthodox Jews do not accept them as Jews unless they undergo a religious conversion through an Orthodox Bet Din. Most Dutch Jews live in the major cities in the west of the Netherlands (Amsterdam, Rotterdam, The Hague, Utrecht); some 44% of all Dutch Jews live in Amsterdam, which is considered the centre of Jewish life in the country. In 2000, 20% of the Jewish-Dutch population was 65 years or older; birth rates among Jews were low. An exception is the growing Orthodox Jewish population, especially in Amsterdam.

There are some 150 synagogues present in the Netherlands; 50 are still used for religious services. Large Jewish communities in the Netherlands are found in Amsterdam, Rotterdam and The Hague.

Various antisemitic incidents continue to occur,. In 2014 a monument was defaced that was dedicated to the Jews of Gorinchem, seventy of whom were murdered in World War II. Commentators associate such incidents with the ongoing tensions in the Middle East. Antisemitic incidents occurred during 2015: graffiti appeared in Oosterhout, a Jewish man was harassed in Amersfoort, and a Jewish cemetery was vandalized in Oud-Beijerland.

In June 2015, De Telegraaf published results of a report on antisemitism among youths, conducted by the Verwey Jonker Institute. The survey revealed that antisemitism is more prevalent among Muslims: 12 percent of Muslim respondents expressed a "not positive" view of Dutch Jews, compared to two percent among Christian respondents. Some 40% of Muslim respondents expressed a "not positive" view for Jews in Israel, compared to 6% of the Christian respondents.

The ADL (Anti-Defamation League) published the "ADL Global 100" (2019), an international survey conducted in 2019 to measure antisemitic opinions in 18 countries around the world. According to the survey, 10% of the population in the Netherlands harbors antisemitic opinions. The survey was composed of eleven phrases that represent antisemitic stereotypes. For example, 43% of the population agreed with the phrase "Jews are more loyal to Israel than to this country", while 20% agreed with "Jews have too much power in the business world".

Religion

Some 9,000 Dutch Jews, out of a total of 30,000 (some 30%), are connected to one of the seven major Jewish religious organizations. Smaller, independent synagogues exist as
well.

Orthodox Judaism
Most affiliated Jews in the Netherlands (Jews part of a Jewish community) are affiliated to the Nederlands Israëlitisch Kerkgenootschap (Dutch Israelite Church) (NIK), which can be classified as part of (Ashkenazi) Orthodox Judaism. The NIK has approximately 5,000 members, spread over 36 congregations (of whom 13 are in Amsterdam and surroundings) in four jurisdictions (Amsterdam, The Hague, Rotterdam and the Interprovincial Rabbinate). It is larger than the Union of Liberal Synagogues (LJG) and thirteen times as large as the Portuguese Israelite Religious Community (PIK). The NIK was founded in 1814. At its height in 1877, it represented 176 Jewish communities. By World War II, it had 139 communities; it is made up of 36 congregations today. Besides governing some 36 congregations, the NIK has responsibility for the operation of more than 200 Jewish cemeteries in the Netherlands (the total is 250).

In 1965 Rabbi Meir Just was appointed Chief Rabbi of the Netherlands, a position he held until his death in April 2010.

The small Portugees-Israëlitisch Kerkgenootschap (Portuguese Israelite Religious Community) (PIK), which is Sephardic in practice, has a membership of some 270 families. It is concentrated in Amsterdam. It was founded in 1870, although Sephardic Jews had long been in the city. Throughout history, Sephardic Jews in the Netherlands, in contrast to their Ashkenazi co-religionists, have settled mostly in a few communities: Amsterdam, The Hague, Rotterdam, Naarden and Middelburg. Only the congregation in Amsterdam survived the Holocaust with enough members to maintain its activities.

Three Jewish schools are located in Amsterdam, all situated in the Buitenveldert neighbourhood (Rosh Pina, Maimonides and Cheider). Cheider is affiliated with Haredi Orthodox Judaism. Chabad has eleven rabbis, in Almere, Amersfoort, Amstelveen, Amsterdam, Haarlem, Maastricht, Rotterdam, The Hague and Utrecht. The head shluchim in the Netherlands are rabbis I. Vorst and Binyomin Jacobs. The latter is chief rabbi of the Interprovinciaal Opperrabbinaat (the Dutch Rabbinical Organisation) and vice-president of Cheider. Chabad serves approximately 2,500 Jews in the Holland region, and an unknown number in the rest of the Netherlands.

Reform Judaism
Though the number of Dutch Jews is decreasing, the last decades have seen a growth of Liberal Jewish communities throughout the country. Introduced by German-Jewish refugees in the early 1930s, nowadays some 3,500 Jews in the Netherlands are linked to one of several Liberal Jewish synagogues throughout the country. Liberal synagogues are present in Amsterdam (founded in 1931; 725 families – some 1,700 members), Rotterdam (1968), The Hague (1959; 324 families), Tilburg (1981), Utrecht (1993), Arnhem (1965; 70 families), Haaksbergen (1972), Almere (2003), Heerenveen (2000; some 30 members) and Zuid-Laren. The Verbond voor Liberaal-Religieuze Joden in Nederland (LJG) (Union for Liberal-Religious Jews in the Netherlands) (to which all the communities mentioned above are part of) is affiliated to the World Union for Progressive Judaism. On 29 October 2006, the LJG changed its name to Nederlands Verbond voor Progressief Jodendom (NVPJ) (Dutch Union for Progressive Judaism). The NVPJ has ten rabbis; some of them are: Menno ten Brink, David Lilienthal, Awraham Soetendorp, Edward van Voolen, Marianne van Praag, Navah-Tehillah Livingstone, Albert Ringer, Tamara Benima.

A new Liberal synagogue has been built (2010) in Amsterdam, 300 meters away from the current synagogue. This was needed since the former building became too small for the growing community. The Liberal synagogue in Amsterdam receives approximately 30 calls a month by people who wish to convert to Judaism. The number of people who complete conversion is much lower. The number of converts to Liberal Judaism may be as high as 200 to 400, in an existing community of approximately 3,500.

Amsterdam is home to Beit Ha'Chidush, a progressive religious community that was founded in 1995 by Jews with secular as well as religious backgrounds. They wanted to create a more open, diverse, and renewed Judaism. The community accepts members from all backgrounds, including homosexuals and half-Jews (including Jews with a Jewish father, the first Jewish community in the Netherlands to do so). Beit Ha'Chidush has links to Jewish Renewal in the United States, and Liberal Judaism in the United Kingdom. The rabbi for the community was German-born Elisa Klapheck, the first female rabbi of the Netherlands. It is now Tamarah Benima.

Reconstructionist Judaism
The Open Jewish Congregation OJG Klal Israël in Delft was founded at the end of 2005, to establish an accepting home for all Jews.  The first service was held on 6 January 2005 in the historic Koornmarkt synagogue of Delft. Services have continued every two weeks, alternating on Friday evening or Saturday morning, next to holidays. Klal Israël has been affiliated with the Jewish Reconstructionist Communities since November 2009. Participation in the activities is open to anyone who feels Jewish, is Jewish, or wants to be Jewish. Klal Israël is a progressive egalitarian community, where women and men enjoy equal rights. The siddurim – prayer books – contain Hebrew text as well as a phonetic transcription and a translation in Dutch. Klal Israël offers a giur procedure. As of the beginning of the Jewish year 5777 (2 October 2016), Hannah Nathans is rabbi of the kehilla (congregation, Hebr.).

Conservative Judaism
Conservative Judaism ("Masorti") was introduced in the Netherlands in 2000, with the founding of a community in the city of Almere. In 2005 Masorti Nederland (Masorti Netherlands) had some 75 families, primarily based in the greater Amsterdam-Almere region.  The congregation uses the 19th century synagogue in the city of Weesp. Its first rabbi is David Soetendorp (1945).

There is also a second Dutch Masorti kehilla in the city of Deventer called Masorti Jewish Community :nl:Beth Shoshanna that began in 2010 and holds services and other activities in the 19th century Great Synagogue of Deventer.

Jewish Renewal
Jewish Renewal was first introduced in the Netherlands in the 1990s by Carola de Vries Robles. HaMakor – Center for Jewish Spirituality is the current home for Jewish Renewal and is led by Rabbi Hannah Nathans. They do not have membership dues and therefore most activities require money paid to participate.

Education and youth

Jewish schools
There are three Jewish schools in the Netherlands, all in Amsterdam and affiliated with the Nederlands Israëlitisch Kerkgenootschap (NIK). Rosj Pina is a school for Jewish children ages 4 through 12. Education is mixed (boys and girls together) despite its affiliation to the Orthodox NIK. It is the largest Jewish school in the Netherlands. As of 2007, it had 285 pupils enrolled. Maimonides is the largest Jewish high school in the Netherlands. It had some 160 pupils enrolled in 2005. Although founded as a Jewish school and affiliated to the NIK, it has a secular curriculum. Cheider, started by former resistance fighter Arthur Juda Cohen, presents education to Jewish children of all ages. Of the three, it is the only school with a Haredi background. Girls and boys are educated in separate classes. The school has some 200 pupils.

The Hague
Tzemach Hasadeh is a Jewish kindergarten in The Hague. It has been active since 1997 and has a Jewish, Dutch and Israeli education program.

Jewish youth
Several Jewish organisations in the Netherlands are focused on Jewish youth. They include:
 Bne Akiwa Holland (Bnei Akiva), a religious Zionist youth organisation.
 CIJO, the youth organisation of CIDI, a political Jewish youth organisation.
 Gan Israel Holland, the Dutch branch of the youth organisation of Chabad.
 Haboniem-Dror, a socialist Zionist youth movement.
 Ijar, a Jewish student organisation
 Moos, an independent Jewish youth organisation
 Netzer Holland, a Zionist youth organisation aligned to the NVPJ
 NextStep, the youth organisation of Een Ander Joods Geluid

Jewish health care
There are two Jewish nursing homes in the Netherlands. One, Beth Shalom, is situated in Amsterdam at two locations, Amsterdam Buitenveldert and Amsterdam Osdorp. There are some 350 elderly Jews currently residing in Beth Shalom. Another Jewish nursing home, the Mr. L.E. Visserhuis, is located in The Hague. It is home to some 50 elderly Jews. Both nursing homes are aligned to Orthodox Judaism; kosher food is available. Both nursing homes have their own synagogue.

There is a Jewish wing at the Amstelland Hospital in Amstelveen. It is unique in Western Europe in that Jewish patients are cared for according to Orthodox Jewish law; kosher food is the only type of food available at the hospital. The Jewish wing was founded after the fusion of the Nicolaas Tulp Hospital and the (Jewish) Central Israelite Patient Care in 1978.

The Sinai Centrum (Sinai Center) is a Jewish psychiatric hospital located in Amsterdam, Amersfoort (primary location) and Amstelveen, which focuses on mental healthcare, as well as caring for and guiding persons who are mentally disabled. It is the only Jewish psychiatric hospital currently operating in Europe. Originally focusing on the Jewish segment of the Dutch population, and especially on Holocaust survivors who were faced with mental problems after the Second World War, nowadays the Sinai Centrum also provides care for non-Jewish victims of war and genocide.

Jewish media
Jewish television and radio in the Netherlands is produced by NIKMedia. Part of NIKMedia is the Joodse Omroep, which broadcasts documentaries, stories and interviews on a variety of Jewish topics every Sunday and Monday on the Nederland 2 television channel (except from the end of May until the beginning of September). NIKMedia is also responsible for broadcasting music and interviews on Radio 5.

The Nieuw Israëlitisch Weekblad is the oldest still functioning (Jewish) weekly in the Netherlands, with some 6,000 subscribers. It is an important news source for many Dutch Jews, focusing on Jewish topics on a national as well as on an international level. The Joods Journaal (Jewish Weekly) was founded in 1997 and is seen as a more "glossy" magazine in comparison to the NIW. It gives a lot of attention to the Israeli–Palestinian conflict. Another Jewish magazine published in the Netherlands is the Hakehillot Magazine, issued by the NIK, the Jewish Community of Amsterdam and the PIK. Serving a more liberal Jewish audience, the NVPJ publishes its own magazine, Levend Joods Geloof (Living Jewish Faith), six times a year; serving this same audience, Beit Ha'Chidush publishes its own magazine as well, called Chidushim.

There are a couple of Jewish websites focusing on bringing Jewish news to the Dutch Jewish community. By far the most prominent is Joods.nl, which gives attention to the large Jewish communities in the Netherlands as well as to the Mediene, to Israel as well as to Jewish culture and youth.

Amsterdam
Amsterdam's Jewish community today numbers about 15,000 people. A large number live in the neighbourhoods of Buitenveldert, the Oud-Zuid and the River Neighbourhood. Buitenveldert is considered a popular neighbourhood to live in; this is due to its low crime-rate and because it is considered to be a quiet neighbourhood.

Especially in the neighbourhood of Buitenveldert there's a sizeable Jewish community. In this area, Kosher food is widely available. There are several Kosher restaurants, two bakeries, Jewish-Israeli shops, a pizzeria and some supermarkets host a Kosher department. This neighourbood also has a Jewish elderly home, an Orthodox synagogue and three Jewish schools.

Cultural distinctions
Uniquely in the Netherlands, Ashkenazi and Sephardi communities coexisted in close proximity. Having different cultural traditions, the communities remained generally separate, but their geographical closeness resulted in cross-cultural influences not found elsewhere. Notably, in the early days when small groups of Jews were attempting to establish communities, they used the services of rabbis and other officials from either culture, depending on who was available.

The close proximity of the two cultures also led to intermarriage at a higher rate than was known elsewhere, and in consequence many Jews of Dutch descent have family names that seem to belie their religious affiliation. All Dutch Jews have for centuries named children after the children's grandparents, which is otherwise considered exclusively a Sephardi tradition. (Ashkenazim elsewhere traditionally avoid naming a child after a living relative.)

In 1812, while the Netherlands was under Napoleonic rule, all Dutch residents (including Jews) were obliged to register surnames with the civic authorities; previously only Sephardim had complied with this. Although the Ashkenazim had avoided civic registration, many had been using an unofficial system of surnames for hundreds of years.

Also under Napoleonic rule, an 1809 law required Dutch Jewish schools to teach in Dutch as well as Hebrew. This excluded other languages. Yiddish, the lingua franca of Ashkenazim, and Judaeo-Portuguese, the previous language of the Portuguese Sephardim, practically ceased to be spoken among Dutch Jews. Certain Yiddish words have been adopted into the Dutch language, especially in Amsterdam, where there was a large Jewish population. (The city is also called Mokum, from the Hebrew word for town or place, makom.)

Several other Hebrew words can be found in the local dialect, including: Mazzel from mazel, which is the Hebrew word for luck or fortune; Tof which is Tov, in Hebrew meaning good (as in מזל טוב – Mazel tov); and Goochem, in Hebrew Chacham or Hakham, meaning wise, sly, witty or intelligent, where the Dutch g is pronounced similarly to the 8th letter of the Hebrew Alphabet the guttural Chet or Heth.

The Dutch Ashkenazi Hebrew pronunciation has some specific features that distinguish it from other pronunciations. Most prominently, the letter "ע" (ayin) is pronounced as "ng" ("ngayin"). Additionally, certain vowels are different from the mainstream Ashkenazi pronunciation.

Economic influences

Jews played a major role in the development of Dutch colonial territories and international trade, and many Jews in former colonies have Dutch ancestry. However, all the major colonial powers were competing fiercely for control of trade routes; the Dutch were relatively unsuccessful and during the 18th century, their economy went into decline.

Many of the Ashkenazim in the rural areas were no longer able to subsist and they migrated to the cities in search of work. This caused a large number of small Jewish communities to collapse completely (ten adult males were required to conduct major religious ceremonies). Entire communities migrated to the cities, where Jewish populations swelled dramatically. In 1700, the Jewish population of Amsterdam was 6,200, with Ashkenazim and Sephardim in almost equal numbers. By 1795 the figure was 20,335, the vast majority being poor Ashkenazim from rural areas.

Because Jews were obliged to live in specified Jewish quarters, there was severe overcrowding. By the mid-nineteenth century, many were emigrating to other countries where the advancement of emancipation offered better opportunities (see Chuts).

See also
 
 Israel–Netherlands relations
 Beit Ha'Chidush
 Jewish Amsterdam
 Jewish Eindhoven
 Jewish Maastricht
 Jewish Tilburg
 List of Dutch Jews
 List of Jews deported from Wageningen (1942-1943)
 Mediene
 Nederlands Israëlitisch Kerkgenootschap
 Nederlands Verbond voor Progressief Jodendom
 Nieuw Israëlietisch Weekblad
 Pallache family
 Portugees-Israëlitisch Kerkgenootschap
 Sephardic Jews in the Netherlands
 Nederlands Israëlitische Gemeente Den Haag

Further reading

 Arbell, Mordechai. The Jewish Nation of the Caribbean: The Spanish-Portuguese Jewish Settlements in the Caribbean and the Guianas. Jerusalem: Gefen Publishing House, 2002.
 Corcos, Joseph. A Synopsis of the History of the Jews of Curaçao. Curazao: Imprenta de la Librería, 1897.
 Emmanuel, Isaac S. and Suzanne A. History of the Jews of the Netherlands Antilles. 2 vols. Cincinnati: American Jewish Archives, 1970.
 Israel, Jonatha I., "Dutch Sephardi Jewry, Millenarian Politics and the Struggle for Brazil, 1650–54". In Jonathan Israel, Conflicts of Empires: Spain, the Low Countries, and the Struggle for World Supremacy, 1585–1713, 145–170. London: The Hambledon Press, 1997.
 Kaplan, Yosef. "Amsterdam, the Forbidden Lands, and the Dynamics of the Sephardi Diaspora". In The Dutch Intersection: The Jews and the Netherlands in Modern History, edited by Yosef Kaplan, 33–62. Leiden: Brill, 2008.
 Klooster, Wim. "The Geopolitical Impact of Dutch Brazil on the Western Hemisphere". In The Legacy of Dutch Brazil, edited by Michiel van Groesen, 25–40. Cambridge: Cambridge University Press, 2015.
 ---. "Networks of Colonial Entrepreneurs: The Founders of Jewish Settlements in Dutch America, 1650s and 1660s". In Atlantic Diasporas: Jews, Conversos, and Crypto-Jews in the Age of Mercantilism, 1500–1800, edited by Richard L. Kagan and Philip D. Morgan, 33–49. Baltimore: The Johns Hopkins University Press, 2009.
 ---. "Communities of Port Jews and Their Contacts in the Dutch Atlantic World". Jewish History 20 (2006): 129–145.
 Offenberg, Adri K. "Spanish and Portuguese Sephardi Books Published in Northern Netherlands before Menasseh Ben Israel (1584–1627)." In Dutch Jewish History: Proceedings of the Fifth Symposium on the History of the Jews in the Netherlands, edited by Jozeph Michman, 77–90. Van Gorcum: The Institute for Research on Dutch Jewry, 1993.
 Swetschinski, Daniel M. Reluctant Cosmopolitans: The Portuguese Jews of Seventeenth-Century Amsterdam. Oxford: Littman Library of Jewish Civilization 2004.
 Williams, James Homer. "An Atlantic Perspective on the Jewish Struggle for Rights and Opportunities in Brazil, New Netherland, and New York". In The Jews and the Expansion of Europe to the West, 1450–1800, edited by Paolo Bernardini and Norman Fiering, 369–393. New York: Berghahn Books, 2001.

References

External links
 Jewish Encyclopedia article on the Netherlands 1906
 The Destruction of the Jews of the Netherlands During the Holocaust
 Jewish Historical Museum (Amsterdam)
 U.S. Holocaust Memorial Museum: 1940–1945 destruction of Holland's Jewish population during the Holocaust
 Center for Research on Dutch Jewry, Hebrew University of Jerusalem
 Archive of the Portuguese-Israelite community in Amsterdam, in the Archives Database of the Amsterdam City Archives
 Archive of the Dutch-Israelite Synagogue, in the Archives Database of the Amsterdam City Archives
 Demos, Demographic Research 
 Joods.nl 
 Wartime and Postwar Dutch Attitudes toward the Jews: Myth and Truth
 Dutch Israelite Religious Community (NIK)
 Dutch Union for Progressive Judaism
 Esnoga (Portuguese-Israelite Synagogue Amsterdam)
 Beit Ha'Chidush
 Masorti Netherlands 
 HaMakor
 Chabad Netherlands  
 Stichting Joods Bijzonder Onderwijs (Association Jewish Education) 
 Digital Monument of the Jewish Community in the Netherlands
 Joods Monument
 Ondergang: De vervolging en verdelging van het Nederlandse jodendom 1940–1945 by Jacques Presser (full online version)
 Dutch Melodies (site of K'hal Adas Yeshurun Jerusalem)